Ali Khan Bayat was the fourth khan of the Maku Khanate from 1822 to 1866.

References

People from Maku, Iran
Maku Khanate
19th-century monarchs of Persia
Year of birth unknown
Year of death unknown